Commissioner v. Wilcox, 327 U.S. 404 (1946), was a case decided by the Supreme Court of the United States.

The issue presented in this case was whether embezzled money constituted taxable income to the embezzler under § 22(a) of the Internal Revenue Code of 1939.

Although the Court ruled that the embezzlement income was not taxable to the embezzler in Wilcox, the Court later overruled the decision in James v. United States.

See also
Taxation of illegal income in the United States
List of United States Supreme Court cases, volume 327

References

Further reading

External links

United States Supreme Court cases
United States Supreme Court cases of the Stone Court
United States taxation and revenue case law
1946 in United States case law
Embezzlement